Safonovo is a rural locality (a village) and the administrative center of Safonovskoye Rural Settlement of Mezensky District, Arkhangelsk Oblast, Russia. The population was 113 as of 2010. There are 13 streets.

Geography 
It is located on the Pyoza River, 224 km east of Mezen (the district's administrative centre) by road.

Population

References 

Rural localities in Mezensky District